Puchow is a village and a former municipality in the Mecklenburgische Seenplatte district, in Mecklenburg-Vorpommern, Germany. Since 1 January 2012, it is part of the municipality Kuckssee.
The former municipality of Puchow comprised both Puchow and its hamlet Rahnenfelde abt. 1,5 km to the south along K21 to Penzlin.

References

Villages in Mecklenburg-Western Pomerania